The J.W. Garner Building is a historic building located  in Ottumwa, Iowa, United States. Built in 1911, it is the work of local architect George M. Kerns. The three-story red brick structure with limestone details exhibits a subdued Neoclassical style. The windows on the second floor are grouped into bays divided by brick pilasters with two windows per bay. The third floor windows have no such division and have a limestone belt course for their sills. There is a simple cornice near the top of the facade. The building was individually listed on the National Register of Historic Places in 2010. In 2016 it was included as a contributing property in the Greater Second Street Historic District.

References

Commercial buildings completed in 1911
Buildings and structures in Ottumwa, Iowa
Neoclassical architecture in Iowa
Commercial buildings on the National Register of Historic Places in Iowa
1911 establishments in Iowa
National Register of Historic Places in Wapello County, Iowa
Individually listed contributing properties to historic districts on the National Register in Iowa